Waller de Montmorency (b and d Knocktopher; 1841 - 1924) was an Anglican priest  in the late nineteenth and early twentieth centuries, most notably Archdeacon of Ossory from 1911 until his death.

A graduate of Trinity College, Cambridge he was ordained in 1866. He was the incumbent at Kilsheelan; and Treasurer of St Canice's Cathedral, Kilkenny. He died on 25 October 1924.

His son was a colonial administrator, twice Governor of the Punjab.

References

External links
 

1841 births
Alumni of Trinity College, Cambridge
Archdeacons of Ossory
1924 deaths
People from County Kilkenny